Estevan (Blue Sky) Aerodrome  is a registered aerodrome located  north of Estevan, Saskatchewan, Canada.

See also 
List of airports in Saskatchewan
Estevan Regional Aerodrome
Estevan (South) Airport
Estevan/Bryant Airport

References

Registered aerodromes in Saskatchewan
Benson No. 35, Saskatchewan
Transport in Estevan